Aurelio Saffi (13 August 1819 – 10 April 1890, full name Marco Aurelio Saffi) was a Roman and Italian politician, active during the period of Italian unification. He was an important figure in the radical republican current within the Risorgimento movement and close to its leader and chief inspiration, Giuseppe Mazzini.

Biography
Saffi was born in Forlì, then part of the Papal States (now Emilia-Romagna region). He received an education in jurisprudence in Ferrara, but began political activity in his native city, protesting against the bad administration of the Papal legates. He was also a member of the communal and provincial councils between 1844 and 1845.

He soon became a fervent supporter of Mazzini's ideas, and in 1849 took part in the short-lived Roman Republic. Saffi was a member of the government that attempted to establish a democratic republic, inspired by the United States. The revolutionaries, however, were soon (June 1849) crushed by French troops, and Saffi retired to Liguria as an exile. From there he joined Mazzini in Switzerland, and then moved with him to London.

Saffi returned to Italy only in 1852, to plan a series of risings to be held in Milan. After the failure of the project in 1853, he fled to England again and was condemned in absentia to twenty years in prison. He was appointed the first teacher of Italian at the Taylor Institute, Oxford, in 1856. While in England he married (1857)  (born Georgiana Janet Craufurd). She was also a fervent supporter of Mazzini, and a feminist. They had four sons: Attilio Joseph (1858 - 1923), Emilio John (1861 - 1930), Charles Balilla Louis (1863 - 1896) and Rinaldo Arthur (1868 - 1929).

In 1860, Saffi moved to Naples, again with Mazzini. The following year he was elected a deputy in the Parliament of the newly formed Kingdom of Italy. Some years later he returned to London, where he remained until 1867. He spent his last days in his villa in the Forlì countryside, moving to Bologna where he had received a professorial chair. He also devoted himself to collecting historical material connected to his friend Giuseppe Mazzini.

He died at the age of seventy at his residence, Villa Saffi, which is now turned into a museum.

There is a statue of Saffi in the central square of his native Forlì.

See also
Roman Republic (19th century)

References

External links

Museo Saffi
Ricordi e scritti di Aurelio Saffi. Pubblicati per cura del Municipio di Forlì (14 volumes), Biblioteca Gino Bianco

1819 births
1890 deaths
People from Forlì
Italian republicans
Deputies of Legislature VIII of the Kingdom of Italy
Deputies of Legislature IX of the Kingdom of Italy
Deputies of Legislature XII of the Kingdom of Italy
Deputies of Legislature XVI of the Kingdom of Italy
Politicians of Emilia-Romagna
People of the Revolutions of 1848
Italian people of the Italian unification
Italian feminists
Male feminists
Critics of the Catholic Church
Italian independence activists
Academic staff of the University of Bologna
Teachers of Italian